Patlolla Sabitha Indra Reddy (born 5 May 1963) is an Indian politician who has been the Minister for Education of Telangana state since 2019. Reddy started her political career with the Indian National Congress and in 2009 became the first woman Home Minister of Andhra Pradesh, serving until 2014. Earlier, she served as the Minister of Mines and Geology of Andhra Pradesh from 2004 to 2009.

Reddy was elected as a Member of the Legislative Assembly of Andhra Pradesh three times, two times from Chevella assembly constituency in 2000 and 2004 and once from Maheshwaram constituency in 2009. Since 2018, she has represented Maheshwaram constituency in the Telangana Legislative Assembly and joined Telangana Rashtra Samithi in 2019.

Early life
Sabitha Indra Reddy was born on 5 May 1963 in Medak to Mahipal Reddy and Venkatamma. She completed her Bachelor of Science degree. She was married to P. Indra Reddy (died 2000), and the couple has 3 sons.

Political career
Sabitha held the position of Mines and Geology Minister in the earlier government. She was the first female Home Minister of a state in the nation. She is an undefeated four time MLA. She was elected twice from Chevella and twice from Maheshwaram after delimitation.

In 2011, Central Bureau of Investigation arrested V. D. Rajagopal and Y. Srilakshmi, as third and fourth accused respectively in the investigation into illegal mining by Obulapuram Mining Company. The permission for mining in Anantapur was for captive mining, i.e. the ore mined in that region is to be used in the local steel plant and not to be exported. Srilakshmi is accused of dropping the term "captive mining" in the final order approving a mining license to Obulapuram.

The CBI defended the Home minister saying there was no justification for the official to blame the Minister. As of April 2013, Sabitha Indra Reddy submitted her resignation letter from the Cabinet after the CBI named her as an accused in the Y. S. Jagan Mohan Reddy illegal investments case.

2000 by-elections
She was pushed into politics through this election as her husband had passed away. In this election, she contested on a Congress ticket from Chevella MLA constituency against KLR who is an industrialist and politician. In this election, through her husband's name, the sympathy of his death and her commitment to work for the people she won the election with a whopping 29,909 votes majority.

2004 general elections
This election, she showed her hard-working nature to her constituents. In this election, she beat the TDP candidate by bettering her previous margin from Chevella. This time she won with a majority of 41,585 votes. Consequently, YSR inculcated her into the Cabinet as Minister of Mines and Geology.

2009 general elections
This election happened just after the constituency delimitation. As a result of this, her bastion Chevella constituency was changed to be an SC-reserved constituency. This resulted in her changing her constituency to the newly formed Maheshwaram (Assembly constituency). Though she moved few days prior to the election to the new constituency, she beat the local stalwart Teegala Krishna Reddy by a margin of 8000 votes. Thus, she became the first female Home Minister of Andhra Pradesh and a first female home minister to any state in India.

2014 general elections

2018 general elections

References

Politicians from Hyderabad, India
Telangana politicians
Women in Telangana politics
Telugu politicians
Living people
1963 births
Indian National Congress politicians from Andhra Pradesh
20th-century Indian women politicians
20th-century Indian politicians
Home Ministers of Andhra Pradesh
Telangana Rashtra Samithi politicians
Telangana MLAs 2018–2023
21st-century Indian women politicians